The springwater dancer (Argia plana) is a damselfly of the family Coenagrionidae.

Description 
The springwater dancer has a black stripe along the side of its thorax. The male is typically blue, but some can be violet.  
The female is pale brown.

Similar species 
Its central range helps to distinguish it from the other blue damselflies with which it is easily confused,
especially the similar looking vivid dancer.
The Apache dancer is larger, but with an overall length of 34-40mm the springwater tends to be larger than
the other similar blue dancers including the lavender dancer.
The stripe on the side of the thorax is forked in the Aztec dancer and variable dancer.

Etymology 
The springwater dancer's preferred habitat of shallow springs is reflected in its common name.
The scientific name, plana, means flat or wandering, but the significance is unknown.

References

External links
 Argia plana on BugGuide.Net

Coenagrionidae
Odonata of North America
Insects of Mexico
Insects of the United States
Insects described in 1902